Walter Scott (21 January 1886 – 1955) was an English professional footballer who played as a goalkeeper in the Football League for Grimsby Town, Sunderland and Everton. He notably became the first goalkeeper to save three penalties in a single match, for Grimsby Town versus Burnley in a Second Division fixture in 1909. He saved 14 of 17 penalties during the 1908–09 season. He represented the Irish League XI.

Personal life 
Scott briefly served as a private in the Army Service Corps during the First World War, being stationed at the Mechanical Transport Training Depot in Osterley Park between July and October 1917.

Career statistics

References

Footballers from Worksop
English footballers
Worksop Town F.C. players
English Football League players
Association football goalkeepers
Brentford F.C. wartime guest players
Grimsby Town F.C. players
Everton F.C. players
Sunderland A.F.C. players
Shelbourne F.C. players
1886 births
1955 deaths
NIFL Premiership players
Gainsborough Trinity F.C. players

Millwall F.C. wartime guest players
British Army personnel of World War I
Royal Army Service Corps soldiers
Irish League representative players